Gladiators Seven (also known as The Revolt of the Seven, The Spartan Gladiator and The Spartan Gladiators) is a 1964 Italian peplum film directed  by Alberto De Martino and starring Tony Russel.

Plot

Cast

 Tony Russel as  Keros 
  Massimo Serato  as Baxo
  Nando Gazzolo  as Milo
  Livio Lorenzon as Nemete
  Piero Lulli as Silone
  Howard Ross as Croto
  Pietro Capanna  as Mardok
  Helga Liné as Aspasia
  Paola Piretti as Elea
  Nando Angelini as The Spying Gladiator
  Walter Maestosi as Criton 
  Gaetano Quartararo as Head of the Gladiators
  Dakar

Release
Gladiators Seven was released in Italy on 28 December 1964.

References

Footnotes

Sources

External links

Peplum films
1960s adventure films
1960s Italian-language films
English-language Italian films
Films directed by Alberto De Martino
Sword and sandal films
1960s Italian films